Prestonville can refer to:

Prestonville, Brighton, England, United Kingdom
Prestonville, Kentucky, United States
Prestonville, North Carolina, United States